FEVR may refer to:

 European Federation of Road Traffic Victims
 Familial exudative vitreoretinopathy
 Fremont and Elkhorn Valley Railroad